The 2015–16 Duke Blue Devils men's basketball team represented Duke University during the 2015–16 NCAA Division I men's basketball season. The Blue Devils were led by 36th year head coach and Hall of Fame member Mike Krzyzewski. The team played its home games at Cameron Indoor Stadium in Durham, North Carolina as members of the Atlantic Coast Conference. They finished the season 25–11, 11–7 in ACC play to finish in a tie for fifth place. They defeated NC State in the second round of the ACC tournament to advance to the quarterfinals where they lost to Notre Dame. They received an at-large bid to the NCAA tournament where they defeated UNC Wilmington and Yale to advance to the Sweet Sixteen where they lost to Oregon.

Off season

Departures

Class of 2015 signees

Roster

Schedule

|-
!colspan=12 style="background:#00009C; color:#FFFFFF;"| Exhibition

|-
!colspan=12 style="background:#00009C; color:#FFFFFF;"| Non-conference regular season

|-
!colspan=12 style="background:#00009C; color:#FFFFFF;"| ACC regular season

|-
!colspan=12 style="background:#00009C; color:#FFFFFF;"| ACC Tournament

|-
!colspan=12 style="background:#00009C; color:#FFFFFF;"| NCAA tournament

Rankings

*AP does not release post-NCAA tournament rankings

References

Duke Blue Devils
Duke Blue Devils men's basketball seasons
Duke
2015 in sports in North Carolina
2016 in sports in North Carolina